Don't You Worry may refer to:

"Don't You Worry" (Madasun song), 2000
"Don't You Worry" (Kelly Rowland song), 2019
"Don't You Worry" (Black Eyed Peas, Shakira and David Guetta song), 2022

See also
Don't Worry 'bout a Thing (disambiguation)